The White River is an American two-forked river that flows through central and southern Indiana and is the main tributary to the Wabash River. Indiana's capital, Indianapolis, is located on the river. The two forks meet just north of Petersburg and empty into the Wabash River at Mount Carmel, Illinois.

West Fork

Federal maps refer to it simply as the White River, per a 1950 Board on Geographic Names decision. It starts south of Winchester in Randolph County at  40° 04' 46" N, 84° 55' 58" W in Washington Township. The river winds through Muncie, Anderson, Noblesville, and Indianapolis before being joined by the east fork in the triad of Daviess, Knox, and Pike counties. Along the way it passes by three Indiana state parks: Mounds State Park, near Anderson; White River State Park, in downtown Indianapolis; and McCormick's Creek State Park, near Spencer. In Indianapolis the Wapahani Trail follows the eastern bank; the Miami tribe had called the river Wapahani, meaning “white sands” or waapikamiiki.

East Fork

The East Fork or Aankwaahsakwa Siipiiw in the native Miami-Illinois language starts in Columbus at the confluence of the Driftwood and Flatrock rivers. The headwaters of the main stem ("West Fork") of the White River are in fact farther east than those of the East Fork. The East Fork flows a total of  generally southwest, passing the city of Seymour, then flowing through rugged terrain before reaching the West Fork.

Lower river
Below the junction of the East Fork, the White River flows another  between Gibson, Knox, and Pike counties before draining into the Wabash River at the Indiana–Illinois border next to Mount Carmel, Illinois, in the vicinity of where the Grand Rapids Dam and Grand Rapids Hotel used to exist. The total White River basin watershed exceeds .

Recreation
While river quality is threatened by pollution, including overflow sewage from Indianapolis and other cities, many recreational activities take place on the White River, including fishing, kayaking, and canoeing. The White River Yacht Club is a boating club that utilizes pontoon boats, and a section of the river in northern Indianapolis has both riverside cottages and pontoon boats.  The river is not deep enough in many stretches to support conventionally-keeled sailing or power boats.

Pollution
In 1997, the White River was listed as one of the United States’ most threatened rivers.

Pesticides (herbicides and insecticides) are used extensively in the White River basin. Application of herbicides to corn and soybeans accounts for most of the use. The pesticides most frequently detected near the mouth of the White River during 1991–1995 were the herbicides alachlor, atrazine, cyanazine, and metolachlor.

The highest concentrations of herbicides in the river were typically found during late spring runoff following application. Generally, concentrations of alachlor have been decreasing while concentrations of acetochlor have been increasing in response to changes in the use of these herbicides in the basin.

The total amount of the commonly used herbicides transported by the river is about 1% or less of the amount applied to cropland. Insecticides commonly used in urban and agricultural areas also were found but in much lower concentrations than commonly used herbicides.

The kill was traced back to Guide Corp, an automotive parts maker in Anderson, which had discharged  of the chemical HMP 2000 into the river. Guide Corp eventually reached a settlement whereby the company would pay a total of $14.2 million in fines, penalties, legal expenses, and river restoration. Many animals that had burrowed into the mud were protected from the chemical, and by March 2000, some fish were naturally returning to the affected area. The Indiana Department of Natural Resources conducted a restocking program in October. The city of Anderson announced in 2002 that it would invest millions of dollars for improvements to its sewage treatment system. Ten years after the fish kill, officials with the DNR stated that the White River was in better condition than before the environmental disaster. Stones along the bank of the river are still bleached, and are a reminder of the chemical spill.

See also
List of Indiana rivers

References

Citations

Sources
Hay, Jerry M, "White River Guidebook" 2009, 
 Nolan, John Matthew "2,543 Days: A History of the Hotel at the Grand Rapids Dam on the Wabash River" Discusses Charles T. Hinde, one of the silent investors of the Hotel del Coronado and how the Hotel del Coronado influenced the Grand Rapids Hotel in Wabash County, Illinois.

External links

Short Documentary on cleanup efforts in Muncie
USGS Occurrence of pesticides in the White River, Indiana, 1991-95
Principal Cities and Towns of the White River Basin

Rivers of Bartholomew County, Indiana
Rivers of Daviess County, Indiana
Rivers of Delaware County, Indiana
Rivers of Dubois County, Indiana
Rivers of Hamilton County, Indiana
Rivers of Greene County, Indiana
Rivers of Henry County, Indiana
Rivers of Jackson County, Indiana
Rivers of Knox County, Indiana
Rivers of Lawrence County, Indiana
Rivers of Madison County, Indiana
Rivers of Marion County, Indiana
Rivers of Martin County, Indiana
Rivers of Morgan County, Indiana
Rivers of Owen County, Indiana
Rivers of Pike County, Indiana
Rivers of Randolph County, Indiana
Rivers of Washington County, Indiana
Geography of Indianapolis
Muncie, Indiana
Rivers of Gibson County, Indiana
Rivers of Indiana
Tributaries of the Wabash River